Albin Thaqi (born 28 March 2002) is a German professional footballer who plays as a defender for Oberliga Westfalen club TuS Bövinghausen.

Club career
Thaqi started his youth career with Borussia Dortmund before joining their rivals Schalke 04 in 2013. He returned to Dortmund in 2017. He made his debut for Borussia Dortmund II on 27 March 2021 in a 1–0 league win against Fortuna Düsseldorf II. He scored his first goal on 24 April in a 3–3 draw against Schalke 04 II. Following their promotion to 3. Liga after 2020–21 season, he made his professional debut on 31 July 2021 in a 1–1 draw against Waldhof Mannheim.

On 31 January 2022, Thaqi moved to Fortuna Köln in Regionalliga West.

International career
Thaqi is a German youth international. He has played two friendlies for under-16 team in 2017.

Personal life
Thaqi is of Kosovan descent.

Career statistics

Club

Honours
Borussia Dortmund II
 Regionalliga West: 2020–21

References

External links
 
 

2002 births
Living people
German people of Kosovan descent
Association football defenders
German footballers
Germany youth international footballers
3. Liga players
Regionalliga players
Oberliga (football) players
Borussia Dortmund II players
SC Fortuna Köln players